Henry Beck (born 1986) is an American lawyer and politician. Henry Beckmay also refer to:

Harry Beck (born Henry Charles Beck; 1902–1974), English technical draughtsman who created the present London Underground Tube map in 1931....
Henry Charlton Beck (1902–1965), author, journalist, historian, ordained Episcopal minister and folklorist
Henry C. Beck III (born 1955), American Texas-born businessman
Harry Beck (footballer) (born Henry Alfred Beck; 1901–1979), English footballer

See also
Henry Bech, fictional character in John Updike works